Gaysky District is an administrative district (raion), one of the thirty-five in Orenburg Oblast, Russia. It is located in the east of the oblast. Its administrative center is the town of Gay (which is not administratively a part of the district). As of the 2010 Census, the total population of the district was 10,331.

Administrative and municipal status
Within the framework of administrative divisions, Gaysky District is one of the thirty-five in the oblast. The town of Gay serves as its administrative center, despite being incorporated separately as an administrative unit with the status equal to that of the districts.

As a municipal division, the territory of the district and the territory of the Town of Gay are incorporated together as Gaysky Urban Okrug. Prior to June 1, 2015, the district was incorporated as Gaysky Municipal District, while the Town of Gay was incorporated separately as Gay Urban Okrug.

References

Notes

Sources

Districts of Orenburg Oblast
